Jarman Impey (born 9 July 1995) is a professional Australian rules footballer playing for the Hawthorn Football Club in the Australian Football League (AFL). He previously played for the Port Adelaide Football Club from 2014 to 2017.

Early life
Originally from Shepparton, Impey played for the Murray Bushrangers in the TAC Cup and represented Victoria Country at the 2013 AFL Under 18 Championships.

AFL career
Impey was drafted by Port Adelaide with their first selection, pick 21, in the 2013 AFL draft. He made his AFL debut against Carlton in the first round of the 2014 season. Since making his debut, Impey has been used a back pocket shut down roll on small forwards. Impey has had mixed results but has been successful against the likes of Hayden Ballantyne, Eddie Betts and Jay Kennedy Harris. In round 8, 2014, Impey was the Rising Star nominee for his defensive performance against Fremantle's Ballantyne.

The start of Impey's 2015 season was curtailed by a hamstring injury, however he only missed one game after returning from injury in round 7. His development into a small lock down defender continued for the rest of the season and in the round 12 match against Carlton he recorded a career-high twenty-three disposals and a season-high four inside-50s.

2016 saw Impey move into Port Adelaide's forward line where he excelled as a small forward with a series of elite performances including three goals against  to lead the Power to victory. He capped off his first season in the forward line by winning the Gavin Wanganeen Medal as Port Adelaide's best player under 21.

Impey was suspended by the club for an off field indiscretion during the summer break and missed round 1 of the 2017 season but bounced back with a handy contribution of nineteen disposals and one goal in round 2 against Fremantle. The round 6 match against the  saw Impey kick a career-high four goals.

During the 2017 trade period, Impey was traded to the Hawthorn Football Club.

On July 21, 2019, Impey suffered an Anterior cruciate ligament injury against Geelong, ending his season.

Statistics 
Updated to the end of the 2022 season.

|-
| 2014 ||  || 24
| 18 || 3 || 2 || 121 || 79 || 200 || 50 || 46 || 0.2 || 0.1 || 6.7 || 4.4 || 11.1 || 2.8 || 2.6 || 0
|-
| 2015 ||  || 24
| 17 || 1 || 4 || 108 || 106 || 214 || 55 || 51 || 0.1 || 0.2 || 6.4 || 6.2 || 12.6 || 3.2 || 3.0 || 0
|-
| 2016 ||  || 24
| 20 || 15 || 10 || 137 || 105 || 242 || 58 || 77 || 0.8 || 0.5 || 6.9 || 5.3 || 12.1 || 2.9 || 3.9 || 3
|-
| 2017 ||  || 24
| 20 || 15 || 14 || 158 || 80 || 238 || 60 || 62 || 0.8 || 0.7 || 7.9 || 4.0 || 11.9 || 3.0 || 3.1 || 0
|-
| 2018 ||  || 4
| 24 || 10 || 10 || 268 || 125 || 393 || 84 || 81 || 0.4 || 0.4 || 11.2 || 5.2 || 16.4 || 3.5 || 3.4 || 0
|-
| 2019 ||  || 4
| 17 || 7 || 3 || 184 || 97 || 281 || 83 || 47 || 0.4 || 0.2 || 10.8 || 5.7 || 16.5 || 4.9 || 2.8 || 1
|-
| 2020 ||  || 4
| 5 || 2 || 3 || 22 || 24 || 46 || 13 || 9 || 0.4 || 0.6 || 4.4 || 4.8 || 9.2 || 2.6 || 1.8 || 0
|-
| 2021 ||  || 4
| 13 || 2 || 0 || 181 || 107 || 288 || 70 || 33 || 0.2 || 0.0 || 13.9 || 8.2 || 22.2 || 5.4 || 2.5 || 0
|-
| 2022 ||  || 4
| 16 || 3 || 8 || 158 || 92 || 250 || 61 || 38 || 0.2 || 0.5 || 9.9 || 5.8 || 15.6 || 3.8 || 2.4 || 0
|- class="sortbottom"
! colspan=3| Career
! 150 !! 58 !! 54 !! 1337 !! 815 !! 2152 !! 534 !! 444 !! 0.4 !! 0.4 !! 8.9 !! 5.4 !! 14.3 !! 3.6 !! 3.0 || 4
|}

Notes

Honours and achievements 
Individual
 Gavin Wanganeen Medal: 2016
  most consistent player: 2019
 AFL Rising Star nominee: 2014
 Indigenous All-Stars team: 2015

References

External links

Living people
1995 births
Hawthorn Football Club players
Port Adelaide Football Club players
Port Adelaide Football Club players (all competitions)
Murray Bushrangers players
Australian rules footballers from Victoria (Australia)
Indigenous Australian players of Australian rules football
People from Shepparton